Robert Norman Richardson (3 March 1882 – 10 March 1949) was an Australian rules footballer who played with Fitzroy in the Victorian Football League (VFL).

Notes

External links 

1882 births
1949 deaths
Australian rules footballers from Victoria (Australia)
Fitzroy Football Club players
South Yarra Football Club players